Fighter Squadron 52 or VF-52 was an aviation unit of the United States Navy. Originally established as Bombing Fighting Squadron 5 (VBF-5) on 8 May 1945, it was redesignated Fighting Squadron 6A (VF-6A) on 15 November 1946, redesignated as Fighter Squadron 52 (VF-52) on 16 August 1948 it was disestablished on 23 February 1959. It was the third US Navy squadron to be designated as VF-52.

Operational history

VF-52 was the only Navy squadron equipped with the TO-1 Shooting Star, a version of the Air Force's F-80C that was acquired to familiarise Navy pilots with jet aircraft due to delays in developing naval jets.

VF-52 along with VF-51, where the first Navy jet squadrons to see combat. On 18 November 1950 VF-52 pilot LtCom William E. Lamb was credited with shooting down a Korean People's Air Force MiG-15, this was the Navy's second jet vs jet kill.

Home port assignments
NAS North Island

Aircraft assignment
F4U-4 Corsair
TO-1 Shooting Star
F9F-2 F9F-5 Panther

F2H-3 Banshee

Notable former members
James L. Holloway III
{[LT John Howard Thayer]} Deceased

See also
History of the United States Navy
List of inactive United States Navy aircraft squadrons
List of United States Navy aircraft squadrons

References

External links

Strike fighter squadrons of the United States Navy